Jentsch is a German surname. Notable people with the surname include:

 Adolph Jentsch (1888–1977), German-born Namibian artist
 Daniela Jentsch (born 1982), German curler
 Ernst Jentsch (1867–1919), German psychiatrist
 J. David Jentsch (born 1972), American neurobiologist
 Julia Jentsch (born 1978), German actress
 Martina Jentsch, (born 1968), German gymnast
 Roland Jentsch, German curler
 Stefan Jentsch (1955–2016), German biologist

German-language surnames
Surnames from given names